Swinford Toll Bridge is a privately owned toll bridge across the Thames in Oxfordshire, England. It crosses the river just above Eynsham Lock, between the village of Eynsham on the north-west bank and the hamlet of Swinford on the south-east bank (in Berkshire until 1974). It carries the B4044 between Oxford and Eynsham, which was the A40 road until the north Oxford bypass was completed in 1936.

It is a Grade II* listed building, and has been scheduled as an ancient monument.

History
 is an archetypal Georgian bridge built of local limestone which opened in 1769. It replaced a pre-existing ferry and its construction was funded by the then Earl of Abingdon. The toll rights and concomitant duty to maintain are by Act of Parliament. It also made the building of bridges across the river illegal for  up or down stream. The bridge was completed two years later.

If annual tolls outweigh annual maintenance the owners do not pay tax on that net income. This is a very rare perquisite agreed by Parliament and George III, rewarding the work of collecting the tolls in all financial circumstances. It provides for a similar tax-free status of formal local authorities, on their surpluses, if any. It is one of the two remaining toll bridges that cross the Thames, the other being Whitchurch Bridge.

Since 1835, tolls for pedestrians have been abolished. Cycles and motorcycles are also exempt from tolls. Other classes of traffic remain subject to tolls. The tariff starts at 5p in the case of cars (without other vehicle or trailer under tow). Campaigns have been occasional to make the bridge toll-free. Oxfordshire County Council estimates that 10,000 motor vehicles cross the bridge each day. Toll collection causes delays in the peak times of day. CCTV enables enforcement against evasion. An online poll in 2006 on the Witney Gazette website showed that 87.5% of voters wanted the tolls scrapped.

The bridge was put up for sale in 2009 and was sold at auction on 3 December for £1.08 million. A campaign calling for Oxfordshire County Council to buy the bridge was unsuccessful.

See also
Crossings of the River Thames

References

Bibliography

External links

Bridges in Oxfordshire
Bridges across the River Thames
Toll bridges in England
Bridges completed in 1769
Robert Taylor buildings
Grade II* listed buildings in Oxfordshire
Scheduled monuments in Oxfordshire